Kovačevac is a village in Brod-Posavina County in Croatia.

Religion 
Local Roman Catholic chapel of Saint Vinko was erected in the village in mid-1960s.

References 

Populated places in Brod-Posavina County